A Generally Sales Agent Cargo Sales Agent,(ACS),(GSA) is a sales representative for an airline in a specific country or region. Typically, the ACS,GSA is responsible for selling cargo space. ACS/GSA will typically sell products from multiple airlines.
 
Airlines normally use a ACS/GSA in areas that it does not operate to or from, allowing them to have a sales presence in a country at lower cost than opening their own offices in the short term. It may also use their services because the ACS/GSA has historical ties with travel and cargo agents, which will be too time-consuming for the airline to build itself.

The ACS/GSA receives a commission of around 3–5% on all revenue tickets and unit of cargo space sold in the region that it represents.

All costs related to running the GSA's business are the responsibility of the GSA, including insurance, rent, general office expenses and any travel within the country or region needed to promote and sell the product.

References 

Airline tickets
Travel agencies